Sweetly You'll Die Through Love (Spanish:Dulcemente morirás por amor or La llamada del sexo) is a 1977 thriller film directed by Tulio Demicheli and starring Andrés Garcia, Rossy Mendoza and George Hilton.

It was a co-production between Mexico, Colombia, Spain and Dominican Republic.

Cast 
 Andrés García as Víctor
 Rossy Mendoza as Mónica
 George Hilton as Carlos
 Verónica Miriel as Karin
 Claudia Gravy as Gloria
 Eduardo Fajardo as Sr. Montero
 Frank Braña as Hermano de Víctor
 Franklin Domínguez
 Augusto Feria
 Teddy Beltrán
 César Olmos
 Liliano Angulo
 Licena de Bas
 Eduardo García
 Fernando Casado
 Felipe Gil
 Víctor Fernández
 Carmen Berroa
 Fernando Hoppelman
 Rubén Echevarría
 René Olmos
 Dulce María Villeta
 Cesarina Castillo
 Don Forrest
 Fernán Tejela
 Ernesto Yáñez

References

Bibliography 
 John King & Nissa Torrents. The Garden of Forking Paths: Argentine Cinema. British Film Institute, 1988.

External links 

1977 films
Dominican Republic drama films
Mexican thriller films
Spanish thriller films
1970s thriller films
1970s Spanish-language films
Films directed by Tulio Demicheli
Colombian thriller films
1970s Mexican films